Hartmann College is a co-educational convent institution in Izzatnagar, Bareilly, India, run by the Christian Catholic Minority and recognized by the Department of Education (U.P). It is affiliated to the Council for the Indian School Certificate Examinations, New Delhi.

The institution is managed and governed by the Order of Friars Minor Capuchin through a registered body, Hartmann Educational Society, Bareilly.

History 
Bishop Anastatius Hartmann (the Patron) was born in Atwis, in the Canton of Lucerne, Switzerland on 24 February 1803.  He came to India as a missionary and worked in places like Gwalior, Patna and Mumbai. He founded schools and dispensaries and carried out charitable works for the poor and weaker sections of society.

Inspired by his life and to carry on his work of educational work the Capuchin fathers founded Hartmann College in 1967, and chose him to be the patron of the college. The motto is "He Who Loves Knowledge Loves Discipline" which was the guiding principle of Bishop Hartmann, the servant of God.

Hartmann College is located at Izzatnagar, Bareilly. Its sister institute, Bishop Hartmann Academy, is situated in Ara Gate, Mahilong, Ranchi – 835103 Jharkhand.

Campus 

There are four sections of each class for NC to 10 and three sections for each class from 11 and 12. The building consists of a auditorium, two large fields and a multimedia. The kids' section consists of special classes. The area of Hartmann College is 90 acres.

References

Capuchin schools
Catholic schools in India
High schools and secondary schools in Uttar Pradesh
Christian schools in Uttar Pradesh
Education in Bareilly
Educational institutions established in 1967
1967 establishments in Uttar Pradesh